Archbishop McGrath Catholic High School is a secondary school located in Brackla, Bridgend. The school has a reputation of having highly talented musicians and in 2011 achieved grades far above the national average. 80% of students stay on to study As-Levels in the sixth form.

Original school 

Originally built in the 1960s, Archbishop McGrath was located next to Ynysawdre Comprehensive School, Ynysawdre, Bridgend. In 2009, arsonists burnt down the Technology Department and heavily damaged the sports hall. The local council and Diocese of Cardiff paid to have replacement portable buildings installed to allow teaching to continue whilst the Technology Department was torn down and the sports hall repaired. As the fire happened in autumn outside of school time, nobody was injured and examinations were not disturbed. Other minor structural problems were prevalent throughout the school, and it was eventually demolished outright by early 2012.

New school 
Following the fire, plans were made to build a new school designed by HLM architects at a site in Brackla, Bridgend just past the 'triangle' shopping area. The contract went to the Leadbitter Group Ltd and construction began in early 2010. Construction was completed by October 2011 but the school was in use by September that year. The new school has won multiple architecture awards and won the Gold Medal for Architecture at the National Eisteddfod of Wales of 2012.

F-Dog Rapper 
Within 2017, F-Dog the Singer/Songwriters entered Archbishop to a new era of music, His career ended in a ball of flame on his first album, never to write again

References

Catholic secondary schools in the Archdiocese of Cardiff
Secondary schools in Bridgend County Borough
Welsh Eisteddfod Gold Medal winners